Matthew Dubé (born May 3, 1988) is a Canadian politician who was elected to the House of Commons in the 2011 federal election to represent the electoral district of Chambly—Borduas in Quebec as a member of the New Democratic Party. He was re-elected in 2015 to the redistributed riding of Beloeil—Chambly but lost his seat in 2019.

Biography
Born in Montreal, Dubé was elected co-president of NDP McGill in September 2010 and was also elected president of the Quebec Young New Democrats in November 2010. At the time of his election to the House of Commons, he was a McGill University student completing his Bachelor of Arts degree majoring in political science with a minor in history.

He married Chantale Neapole on June 30, 2018.

Politics
Dubé defeated incumbent MP Yves Lessard of the Bloc Québécois by 15.1% or more than 10,000 votes in the 2011 election. Specifically, Dubé received 42.7% of the vote, Lessard received 27.6%, independent candidate Jean-François Mercier received 11.4%, Liberal Party candidate Bernard DeLorme received 8.9%, Conservative Party candidate Nathalie Ferland Drolet received 7.9%, and Green Party candidate Nicholas Lescarbeau received 1.5%.

He was one of five current McGill University students, alongside fellow undergraduates Mylène Freeman, Laurin Liu, and Charmaine Borg, and graduate student Jamie Nicholls, elected to Parliament in the 2011 election following the New Democratic Party's unexpected mid-campaign surge in Quebec.

Borg and Dubé were co-presidents of NDP McGill (the NDP student group at McGill University) at the time that they both won election to Parliament, and both had spent the campaign working to re-elect NDP Quebec lieutenant Tom Mulcair in the nearby riding of Outremont.

At the time of his election, Dubé had coached junior-league soccer and hockey for several years.

Dubé was the only one of the so-called "McGill 5" re-elected in the 2015 election. Mulcair, by this time leader of the NDP, appointed Dubé to be the NDP critic for Infrastructure and Communities and Deputy House Leader in the 42nd Canadian Parliament. Subsequently, under Mulcair's successor Jagmeet Singh, Dubé went on to become the party’s Public Safety and Emergency Preparedness critic as well as the NDP caucus chair.

He lost his seat to Yves-François Blanchet, leader of the Bloc Québécois, in the 2019 Canadian federal election.

Electoral record

References

External links

Campaign web site

1988 births
Living people
McGill University alumni
Members of the House of Commons of Canada from Quebec
New Democratic Party MPs
Politicians from Montreal
21st-century Canadian politicians